Sackur is a surname. Notable people with the surname include:

Otto Sackur (1880-1914), German chemist
Stephen Sackur (born 1964), English journalist